MPL Philippines Season 11, commonly known as MPL PH is the eleventh iteration of the Mobile Legends: Bang Bang Professional League of the Philippines. Holding the first season for 2023, MPL Philippines began after the recently concluded MLBB M4 World Championship in Jakarta.

MPL Philippines will be the direct qualifier tournament for the summer competition Mobile Legends: Bang Bang Southeast Asia Cup 2023 (MSC 2023) and the Philippines will have two teams to represent the country in the tournament. Previously, RSG Philippines defeated Indonesia's representatives RRQ Hoshi in 2022.

The battlecry "Lakas ng Pinas" (Eng: Strength of the Philippines) is still currently used as the official slogan of MPL Philippines Season 11 after being introduced in MPL Philippines Season 9.

Defending Champions and MLBB M3 World Champions Blacklist International will be defending their title in the said tournament, hoping to be the first team to repeat twice in different occasions. Previously, Blacklist International won back-to-back championship titles in MPL Philippines Season 7 and MPL Philippines Season 8. They defeated ECHO Philippines in MPL Philippines Season 10 to be the first team in MPL Philippines history to win three championship titles.

Participating teams 
With the establishment of MDL Philippines, it was recently announced that the relegation of teams from the MDL to the MPL and vice versa will now be allowed.

Roster Changes

MPL Philippines 
Following the conclusion of MPL Philippines Season 10, offseason changes began with the eight franchise teams of MPL Philippines to prepare for Season 11.

Venue and competition format

Venue 
Following the easing of restrictions on face-to-face activities in the Philippines, MPL Philippines Season 10 became the first season to be in an all-offline tournament format with sold-out venues and crowds. After a soft-MPL Philippines Season 9 test, MPL Philippines Season 10 and 11 became the first three tournament since the COVID-19 pandemic to be fully opened to the public.

In the official MPL Philippines Season 11 Facebook page, it was announced that the Regular Season will be held at the Shooting Gallery Studios in Makati City's Central Business District.

Competition format 
Similar to its preceding seasons, MPL Philippines Season 11 will follow the Double Round-robin tournament format during the regular season. The double round-robin tournament is a system of matches where competing teams will face each other twice. With eight teams participating, a total of fourteen games will be played. Following the regular season, the playoffs will follow. The playoffs for MPL Philippines Season 11 will follow a Double-elimination tournament. Seeds 1 and 2 will be slated in the Upper-brackets Semifinals while Seeds 3 to 6 will be facing each other in the Quarterfinals to determine the teams who will contest Seeds 1 and 2. During MPL Philippines Season 8, Seeds 3 to 6 were seeded at their respective place, however, during the course of MPL Philippines Season 9, the first-seeded team were able to readjust the seeding positions for each play-in tournament team.

Stage points are distributed accordingly throughout the eight teams. These points will be based off their match performances:

 A team will receive 3 points if they win a 2-0 match against their opponent. The opposing team will receive 0 points.
 A team will receive 2 points if they win a 2-1 match against their opponent. The opposing team will receive 1 point.

Regular season results

Mid-Season transfers

March 17, 2023 
Following a committee decision to allow MDL players and MPL players be transferred to each league, Blacklist International Gold Lane Archer "ARCHER" Perez will be relegated to the MDL and Southeast Asian Games Gold Medalist Lee "Owl" Gonzales will be transferred to the official roster.

Playoffs 
Following the Regular Season, the playoffs will not immediately begin. A period of rest will be given to every team to prepare for the playoffs.

MDL Philippines 

Prior to the announcement of Season 11 rosters, MDL Philippines was announced to be held on February 15, 2023, for its first season. The MDL, commonly known as the Mobile Legends: Bang Bang Development League is an amateur league for amateur/veteran players of the Philippines. Both the Philippines and Indonesia have MDL Leagues.

MDL Philippines Season 1 features veteran MPL PH players and stars such as Carlito "Ribo" Ribo Jr., Kiel Calvin "OHEB" Soriano, and Joshwell Christian "Iy4knu" Manaog, who previously played in MPL Philippines for Bren Esports, Blacklist International, and RSG Philippines, respectively.

MDL Philippines Season 1 will feature ten teams, eight MDL teams for the eight franchise teams of MPL Philippines, and two amateur pro-teams in Gamelab Esports and ZOL Esports.

Team standings 
Following the conclusion of MDL Philippines S1, Week 3, the ten participating teams were divided into two groups.

Group A

Group B

References 

Esports competitions in the Philippines
Mobile Legends: Bang Bang competitions